Bjørn Hagen (born 4 April 1960) is a Norwegian speed skater, born in Oslo. He competed at the 1988 Winter Olympics in Calgary.

He was Norwegian sprint champion in 1988.

References

1960 births
Living people
Sportspeople from Oslo
Norwegian male speed skaters
Olympic speed skaters of Norway
Speed skaters at the 1988 Winter Olympics